Subclass Coleoidea, or Dibranchiata, is the grouping of cephalopods containing all the various taxa popularly thought of as "soft-bodied" or "shell-less" (i.e., octopuses, squid and cuttlefish). Unlike its extant sister group, Nautiloidea, whose members have a rigid outer shell for protection, the coleoids have at most an internal cuttlebone, gladius, or shell that is used for buoyancy or support. Some species have lost their cuttlebone altogether, while in some it has been replaced by a chitinous support structure. A unique trait of the group is the ability to edit their own RNA.

The major divisions of Coleoidea are based upon the number of arms or tentacles and their structure. The extinct and most primitive form, the Belemnoidea, presumably had ten equally-sized arms in five pairs numbered dorsal to ventral as I, II, III, IV and V. More modern species either modified or lost a pair of arms. The superorder Decapodiformes has arm pair IV modified into long tentacles with suckers generally only on the club-shaped distal end. Superorder Octopodiformes has modifications to arm pair II; it is significantly reduced and used only as a sensory filament in the Vampyromorphida, while Octopoda species have totally lost that arm pair.

Evolutionary history
The earliest certain coleoids are known from the Mississippian sub-period of the Carboniferous Period, about 330 million years ago. Some older fossils have been described from the Devonian,
but paleontologists disagree about whether they are coleoids. Other cephalopods with internal shells, which could represent coleoids but may also denote the independent internalization of the shell, are known from the Silurian. It has been hypothesized that the Early–Middle Cambrian fossil Nectocaris represents a coleoid (or other cephalopod) that lost its shell, possibly secondarily, although it is more likely that Nectocaris represents an independent lineage within the Lophotrochozoa.

By the Carboniferous, coleoids already had a diversity of forms, but the major radiation happened during the Tertiary. Although most of these groups are traditionally classified as belemnoids, the variation among them suggests that some are not closely related to belemnites.

Classification
Class Cephalopoda
Subclass Nautiloidea: nautilus
Subclass †Ammonoidea: ammonites
Subclass Coleoidea
Division †Belemnoidea: extinct belemnoids
Genus †Jeletzkya
Order †Hematitida
Order †Phragmoteuthida
Order †Donovaniconida
Order †Aulacocerida
Order †Belemnitida
Division Neocoleoidea
Superorder Decapodiformes
Order Spirulida: ram's horn squid
Order Sepiida: cuttlefish
Order Sepiolida: bobtail squid
Order Myopsida: coastal squid
Order Oegopsida: neritic squid
Superorder Octopodiformes
Family †Trachyteuthididae (incertae sedis)
Order Vampyromorphida: vampire squid
Order Octopoda: octopus
Superorder Palaeoteuthomorpha
Order †Boletzkyida
 (uncertain order)
 family †Ostenoteuthidae

References

External links
 
 Tree of Life web project: Coleoidea
 "Octopuses Do Something Really Strange to Their Genes"

Coleoidea
Mollusc subclasses
Carboniferous first appearances